Farishta is a 1958 Bollywood suspense thriller film directed by Ravindra Dave. It stars Sohrab Modi, Ashok Kumar, Meena Kumari as lead protagonist. The film was above average.

Cast
Sohrab Modi as Dayal
Ashok Kumar as Chandan / Ashok
Meena Kumari as Shobha
Anita Guha as Rani
Mehmood as Sukhiya
Nana Palsikar as Ramdin
Mubarak as Leeladhar
Murad as Bagga

Soundtrack

References

External links
 

Films scored by O. P. Nayyar
1958 films
1950s Hindi-language films
Films directed by Ravindra Dave